Mariehemsängarna is a green area in Umeå, located between Mariehem and Stadsliden. The area is characterized by large lawns. Through the park runs a small river with a few ponds that usually house the swans and ducks in the summer.

References

Parks in Umeå